The Girl Said No is a 1930 pre-Code American romantic comedy film starring William Haines and Leila Hyams. In the film, a young college graduate goes to extreme lengths to win the girl he loves.

Plot
Tom Ward, a cocky young football hero, returns home after graduation determined to conquer the world. He begins a flirtation with Mary Howe, secretary to his rival, McAndrews, and in a restaurant he bribes a waiter to spill soup on her employer. Although offered a local banking job, Tom stakes his fortunes on a scheme to sell bonds to wealthy old Hattie Brown, a befuddled spinster, and achieves the difficult task while posing as a doctor by getting her drunk. Finally, desperate over Mary's engagement to McAndrews, Tom kidnaps her from the altar. In a chase finale she is convinced that he loves her.

Cast
William Haines as Tom Ward
Leila Hyams as Mary Howe
Polly Moran as Polly
Marie Dressler as Hettie Brown
Ralph Bushman as J. Marvin McAndrews
Clara Blandick as Mrs Ward
William Janney as Jimmie Ward
William V. Mong as Samuel A. Ward
Frank Coghlan as Eddie Ward
Phyllis Crane as Alma Ward

Production
After the box office success of Anna Christie (1930) and the rave reviews that not only Greta Garbo received for her performance but also her co-star Marie Dressler, M-G-M management decided to cast the latter actress in The Girl Said No. Although Dressler was happy to have a new assignment from the studio, she had to hide her disappointment over the script and her role.

According to biographer Betty Lee in Marie Dressler: The Unlikeliest Star, "It seemed fairly obvious..that although M-G-M was impressed with Dressler's potential...the top office did not know how to handle their unique new contract player. [Studio head] Louis B. Mayer, who had already informed his minions that he wanted Dressler to be marketed as a mother figure who was also a battered version of life's wars, asked her to lunch in his private bungalow on the Culver City lot. Not only did Dressler appear to be a substantial mother figure in real life, M-G-M's boss was also aware that the actress exuded an easy air of upper-class panache. She was, he decided, a far classier individual than the Hollywood glamour girls he often professed to disdain."

Dressler would go on to star in a total of seven films in 1930 and win an Academy Award for her performance in Min and Bill (1930), opposite Wallace Beery.

External links

1930 films
1930 romantic comedy films
American romantic comedy films
American black-and-white films
Films directed by Sam Wood
Metro-Goldwyn-Mayer films
Films with screenplays by Charles MacArthur
1930s English-language films
1930s American films